Quraish: The game is a 2005 real-time strategy 3D computer video game produced by Syrian video game production, Afkar Media. It is the second Arabic language-based game and a third person strategy game based on the early battles of Islam, primarily focusing on the Rashidun Caliphate's successful campaigns against the Eastern Roman Empire and the Sassanid dynasty of Persia.

References

External links
 Official website 

2005 video games
Android (operating system) games
Real-time strategy video games
War video games set in Asia
Video games developed in Syria
Video games set in the Byzantine Empire
War video games set in Europe
Windows games